is a caldera lake in Chitose, Hokkaidō, Japan. It is a part of the Shikotsu-Toya National Park.

Geography 
Lake Shikotsu is located in the south-west part of Hokkaidō. It is the 8th-largest lake by surface area in Japan and the second largest of Japan's caldera lakes, surpassed only by Lake Kussharo. It is surrounded by three volcanos: Mount Eniwa to the north and Mount Fuppushi and Mount Tarumae to the south. The caldera formed in the holocene when the land between the volcanos subsided.

Due to its depth, the volume of Lake Shikotsu reaches 3/4 of the volume of Lake Biwa, Japan's largest lake, despite of having only 1/9 of that lake's surface area. Due to the small surface area to depth ratio, the water temperature remains quite constant throughout the year, making it the northernmost ice-free lake in Japan. The Bifue, Okotanpe, Ninaru and Furenai rivers feed into it, and its main outlet is the Chitose River.

Climate

Geology
The caldera on which Lake Shikotsu sits was formed 40 to 50 thousand years ago. According to the Global Volcanism Program, the caldera was formed 31 to 34 thousand years ago by one of Hokkaidō's largest quaternary eruptions. The caldera consists mainly of dacite, rhyolite, and andesite. The volcanoes Mount Tarumae, Mount Eniwa, and Mount Fuppushi formed on the rim of this caldera.

Origin of the name
The name of Lake Shikotsu derives from the Ainu language shikot, meaning big depression or hollow. To the Japanese, this sounded too much like , so they attempted to rename it engi, but this name did not stick.

Use 
The red salmon (locally called "chippu"), introduced from Lake Akan in 1895, has become a noted product of the area and chippu fishing is now a favourite pastime in summer. A visitor centre, various campgrounds and Onsen provide facilities for tourists coming to the area.

Chitose is famous for its “Indian Fish Wheel”, a device situated in the Chitose River to collect salmon returning to spawn at Lake Shikotsu.

Transport 
National Highway 276 runs along the southern bank, connecting the lake with Tomakomai and Date. Highway 453 runs from the eastern and northern parts of the lake to Sapporo.

City bus routes from Chitose lead to the lake. Hokkaido Chuo Bus connect Shikotsu-ko with Chitose Station and New Chitose Airport. In the summer, there is also a bus from Sapporo Terminal. The former bus service between the lake and Tomakomai has been discontinued.

Gallery

See also 
 List of volcanoes in Japan
 List of lakes in Japan

References

External links 

 World Lakes Database: Shikotsu-ko
 Volcano World: Shikotsu
 Shikotsu-ko Visitor Centre (in Japanese)
 Shikotsu-ko Onsen-Ryokan Association (in Japanese)
 Shikotsu Caldera - Geological Survey of Japan

Shikotsu
Shikotsu
Shikotsu
Shikotsu-Tōya National Park
Shikotsu
Pleistocene calderas
Holocene calderas